A Mist of Prophecies is a historical novel by American author Steven Saylor, first published by St. Martin's Press in 2002. It is the ninth book in his Roma Sub Rosa series of mystery stories set in the final decades of the Roman Republic. The main character is the Roman sleuth Gordianus the Finder.

Plot summary
The year is 48 BC, and there is civil war in the Roman Empire. In Rome, the beautiful and mysterious seeress called Cassandra is poisoned, and dies in the arms of Gordianus in the market. While the Finder attempts to uncover her murderer, the armies of Caesar and Pompey are about to clash in Greece.

Roma Sub Rosa
2002 American novels
Novels set in the 1st century BC
48 BC
St. Martin's Press books